Collessophila is a genus of crane fly in the family Limoniidae. There is only one known species. The epithet commemorates Australian entomologist Donald Henry Colless

Distribution
Queensland, Australia.

Species
C. chookachooka Theischinger, 1994

References

Limoniidae
Nematocera genera
Diptera of Australasia